Andetrium was an ancient city in Illyria, located in modern day Muć or Gornji Muć in the interior of Dalmatia, Croatia.

Andetrium was the location of a Roman cohort in the territory of the Delmatae. During a Roman siege there in AD9, Arminius's younger brother Flavus lost an eye.

See also 
List of Illyrian cities

References

Citations

Bibliography

Former populated places in the Balkans
Illyrian Croatia
Cities in ancient Illyria